KT Wiz are a South Korean professional baseball team based in Suwon. They are a member of the KBO League. Their home stadium is Suwon Baseball Stadium in Suwon.

History 
On 11 January 2013, the Korea Baseball Organization officially approved KT Baseball Club's admission to KBO League, beginning with the 2015 season. The Suwon KT Wiz played the 2013 season as part of the KBO Futures League's Freedom Division, and the 2014 season as part of the Futures League's Blue League division. In 2015, the team was elevated to the KBO League.

As a new KBO League team in 2015, the Wiz were allowed four foreign players on their roster each season (as opposed to the usual three). Foreign players signed by the Wiz for the 2015 season were pitchers Phil Irwin, Andrew Sisco and Chris Oxspring, and hitter Andy Marte (Sisco and Irwin were both released mid-season and replaced by Dan Black and Justin Germano, respectively). Beginning in the 2017 season, the Wiz's allowed allotment of foreign players reverted to three to match the rest of the league.

After five straight seasons without a playoff appearance, Wiz finally broke through in 2020, finishing second with a 81–62–1 record. They were eliminated by the Doosan Bears in the semifinals after four games. The following year, for the first time in franchise history, KT Wiz became regular season champions after defeating the Samsung Lions in an additional tiebreaker and advanced directly to the Korean Series. In the final, they won their first Korean Series title, sweeping the Doosan Bears in four games.

Season-by-season records

Current squad

Managers
Cho Bum-hyun (2013–2016)
Kim Jin-wook (2017–2018)
Lee Kang-chul (2019–present)

References 
General

 Notes

External links 

  
  

 
KBO League teams
Sport in Suwon
Baseball teams established in 2013
Wiz
2013 establishments in South Korea